Foot Ball Club Melgar, known simply as FBC Melgar or Melgar, is a Peruvian football club based in Arequipa, Peru. It is one of Peru's oldest football teams, founded on 25 March 1915 by a group of football enthusiasts from Arequipa.

The team first participated in the Peruvian football league in 1919 in Lima and later was invited to the first true National football league, the Torneo Descentralizado, in 1966, when four teams from the provinces were invited to join the league. Joining them were Atlético Grau from Piura, Club Octavio Espinoza from Ica and Alfonso Ugarte (Ch) from Trujillo. Previously, only teams from Lima and Callao had been allowed to compete for the national championship. Due to a low finish the first year, Melgar was dropped from the league after the first year. After winning the Copa Perú they returned to the First Division where they have remained to this day. Melgar won the Torneo Descentralizado for the first time in 1981. In the 1983 season the club finished first in the First Stage and at the end the top six teams played a play-off tournament to determine the year's champion, which Melgar finished in second.

FBC Melgar plays its home games at the Estadio Mariano Melgar, but since the Estadio de la UNSA was built in 1990 with a capacity of 40,000, it has used both.

History
The club won nine cups in the departament of Arequipa, and won the Copa Perú in 1971. This championship allowed them to return to the First Division Campeonato Descentralizado where they currently remain.

Melgar won the National Championship in 1981, and Melgar was the runner-up of the national championship in 1983. In both these years this qualified them to play in the Copa Libertadores.

In 2014, Juan Reynoso, who come from México, was appointed as the new manager. He signed players like Piero Alva, Nelinho Quina, Minzum Quina, Luis Hernández, Alejandro Hohberg, Lampros Kontogiannis and Edgar Villamarín to make an impressive campaign where Melgar was the best team during the whole season finishing 1st in the accumulated table, but due to some bad results in the final matches and the poor organization of the tournament they weren't able to dispute the Play-off for the championship and only qualified for the Copa Sudamericana.

In 2015, year of Melgar's centenary, and still with Reynoso as the manager, the team signed important players like Raúl Ruidíaz, Carlos Ascues, Johnnier Montaño, Rainer Torres and Daniel Ferreyra to make an impressive team and fight for the title. Then, Melgar won the national championship, besting Sporting Cristal with a score in the final minute by Bernardo Cuesta. 

In 2022, Melgar took part of Copa Sudamericana, where they finished 1st in their group. They took on Deportivo Cali, where they drew 0-0 in Cali, and then Melgar took the victory in a 2-1 win in Arequipa, with Bernardo Cuesta scoring both 2. In the Quarter-Finals, they took on Sport Club Internacional, where they drew 0-0 in Arequipa, and then they drew 0-0 in Beira Rio. They beat Internacional on penalties, 3-1, with Carlos Cáceda, Melgar’s goalie, saving 3 shots and only conceding 1 with Luis Iberico making the last penalty shot to take Melgar to the Semi-Finals against C.S.D. Independiente del Valle. The Ecuadorian side would prove too strong for Melgar over the two legs, winning both games 3-0, thus bringing the historic continental adventure to an end.

Rivalries
FBC Melgar has had a long-standing rivalry with Cienciano, Sportivo Huracán, Aurora and Piérola.

Women's team
Copa Perú Femenina:
Winners (1): 2022

Honours

National

League
Peruvian Primera División:
Winners (2): 1981, 2015
Runner-up (3): 1983, 2016, 2022

Torneo Apertura:
Winners (1): 2022
Runner-up (2): 2014, 2015

Torneo Clausura:
Winners (2): 2015, 2018

Torneo de Verano:
Winners (1): 2017

Copa Perú:
Winners (1): 1971
Runner up (2): 1969, 1970

National cups
Copa Presidente de la República: 
Runner-up (1): 1970

Under-20 team
Torneo de Promoción y Reserva:
Winners (2): 2014-II, 2015-II
Runner-up (1): 2015-I

Regional
Liga Departamental de Arequipa:
Winners (6): 1965, 1967, 1968, 1969, 1970, 1971

Liga Distrital de Arequipa:
Winners (9): 1928, 1929, 1962, 1964, 1965, 1967, 1968, 1969, 1970

Performance in CONMEBOL competitions

A = appearances, P = matches played, W = won, D = drawn, L = lost, GF = goals for, GA = goals against, DG = difference goals, Pts = points.

Current squad

Notable players

  Eduardo Márquez
  Armando Palacios
  Genaro Neyra
  Ernesto Neyra
  Raúl Obando
  Gustavo Bobadilla
  Walter Zevallos
  Ysrael Zúñiga
  Bernardo Cuesta
  Omar Fernández

Historical list of coaches

 Fernando Cuéllar (1997)
 Freddy Ternero (1998)
 Roberto Mosquera (2004–05)
 Teddy Cardama (1 January 2006 – 31 December 2006)
 Rafael Castillo (2006–07)
 Gustavo Bobadilla (1 January 2008 – 24 September 2008)
  (26 August 2008 – 30 August 2009)
 Ernesto Vera (1 August 2009 – 31 December 2009)
 Luis Flores (1 September 2009 – 20 February 2010)
 Carlos Manta (5 January 2010 – 26 May 2010)
 Carlos Jurado (31 May 2010 – 10 December 2010)
  (1 January 2011 – 16 May 2011)
 Wilmar Valencia (2 May 2011 – 10 January 2012)
 Julio Alberto Zamora (13 December 2011 – 31 December 2012)
 Fabián Marcelo Straccia (1 January 2013 – 11 March 2013)
 Ricardo Medina (interim) (12 March 2013 – 31 March 2013)
 Franco Navarro (1 April 2013 – 7 September 2013)
 Juan Reynoso (8 January 2014 – 1 October 2017)
 Enrique Maximiliano Meza (5 October 2017 – 30 April 2018)
 Hernán Torres (24 May 2018 – 11 December 2018)
 Jorge Pautasso(26 December 2018 – 21 May 2019)
 Diego Osella(14 June 2019 – 27 October 2019)
 Carlos Bustos(2 December 2019– 24 September 2020)
 Néstor Lorenzo(16 December 2020– 7 July 2022)
 Pablo Lavallén(3 July 2022–)

See also

 Arequipa
 Mariano Melgar
 List of Peruvian Stadiums
 Peru national football team

References

External links
 Official Melgar fans site